Brendan Dooling (born January 27, 1990) is an American actor. He is known for his portrayal of Walt Reynolds on The CW's teen drama series The Carrie Diaries.

Personal life
Dooling was born in Bellport, New York, where he took acting classes at the Gateway Acting School. He resides in Brooklyn, New York City, and enjoys Ultimate Frisbee.

Filmography

References

External links
 

1990 births
21st-century American male actors
American male film actors
American male television actors
American male voice actors
Living people
Male actors from New York City
People from Bellport, New York
People from Brooklyn